Visitors to Libya must obtain a visa from one of the Libyan diplomatic missions unless they come from one of the visa exempt countries.

"Most Europeans, including Eastern Europeans, most South Americans, Australians, Russians, Japanese, New Zealanders, South Africans, Canadians and Americans" are eligible to apply for a tourist visa on arrival.  there were plans to reintroduce tourist visas. Libyan borders with Chad, Niger, Sudan and Algeria are closed. In reality these borders are not controlled by the Government but by Tuareg people and Toubou people.

As of 2013, governments of the United States, New Zealand, Australia, Canada, Republic of Ireland, the United Kingdom, Spain, France, Hungary, Latvia, Germany, Austria, Bulgaria, Norway, Croatia, Romania, Slovenia, Czech Republic, Russia, Denmark, Slovakia, Estonia, Italy, Poland, Iran and South Korea (as travel banned) advise their citizens against all (or in some cases all but essential) travel to Libya.

Libya also plans to establish electronic visas soon.

Visa policy map

Visa exemption 
Citizens of the following countries can visit Libya without a visa:

 
 - for visits up to 1 month; only if holding a 5-year passport, which must be valid for at least one year on arrival.

Restricted visa-free access 

 - for residents of Matrouh Governorate on Wednesdays and Thursdays.
 - for visits up to 3 months; only if they hold an authorisation from the Libyan immigration authorities.
 - Must hold a letter from an established company in Libya sponsoring their visit.

Visa is not required for holders of a copy of a letter issued by the Libyan immigration authorities confirming that a visa will be granted on arrival at the airport.

Holders of diplomatic, official or service passports of Azerbaijan, Italy, Malta, Morocco, Pakistan, Slovenia, Sudan and Venezuela and holders of only diplomatic passports of Benin, Burkina Faso, Central African Republic, Chad, Comoros, Cote d'Ivoire, Djibouti, Eritrea, Gambia, Ghana, Guinea, Guinea-Bissau, Kenya, Liberia, Mali, Niger, Nigeria, Sao Tome and Principe, Senegal, Sierra Leone, Somalia and Togo do not require a visa for Libya.

Compulsory currency exchange 
Visitors travelling to Libya for touristic purposes are required to convert US$1,000, or equivalent, in freely convertible cash or debit the amount from a valid credit card upon arrival. Failure to do so will result in the traveler being refused entry. Exempt are those visiting a resident, provided holding proof of sponsorship covering entire stay and those traveling as part of a paid tourist package if holding a valid visa.

Entry restrictions

Qatar
Entry or transit through other ports of entry is refused to Qatari nationals.

Entry banned

Nationals of the following 6 countries are not allowed to enter Libya; however,  they are permitted to transit in Libya:

Israel
Entry and transit is banned to  nationals, even if not leaving the aircraft and proceeding by the same flight. Visitors (regardless of nationality) will also be refused entry and transit if holding travel documents containing an Israeli visa, or any evidence of having entered Israel.

See also

 Visa requirements for Libyan citizens

References 

Libya
Foreign relations of Libya